Steve Baer is an American investor and conservative political activist.

In 2013, the National Review published an article about Baer titled This Conservative Mega-Donor Is the World’s Most Successful E-mail Harasser. The article said that he was known for "sending combative and colorful e-mail missives in past months to a who’s-who list of power brokers in the conservative world."  A 2016 Huffington Post critic said, "Baer’s style is to liberally cc and bcc an endless stream of powerful people, and it usually has the effect of getting none of them to listen."

Baer is the former president of the United Republican Fund of Illinois. He received around 250,000 votes in the 1990 Illinois Republican gubernatorial primary on an anti-tax, anti-abortion and school choice platform versus GOP Secretary of State Jim Edgar, who later became governor.  After his loss, The Chicago Tribune wrote that "Baer fancies himself as a foot soldier of the Republican Right. But his self-satisfied smirk and preoccupation with political pranks and hijinks are irrepressible." A more recent Daily Beast report said Baer is "well known in conservative circles as a professional rabble rouser who delighted in taking aim at Republicans whom he thinks are less conservative than his Grand Old Party deserves."

Baer and his wife, Donna, are the parents of ten children.

References

Living people
People from Chandler, Arizona
Brown University alumni
Illinois Republicans
Year of birth missing (living people)